There are several characters in American wild west history known as Mountain Charley.

 Elsa Jane Forest Guerin, a woman who lived disguised as a man to avenge her husband's murder.
 Charlotte Hatfield, a female soldier for the Union Army whose true name may be Elsa Jane Guerin
 Charles Henry McKiernan (1825–1892), early settler in  California
 Charley Parkhurst (1812–1879), American stagecoach driver, farmer and rancher in California discovered after "his" death to be a woman

Lists of people by nickname